"Zu dir, o Gott, erheben wir" (To you, O God, we raise [the soul]) is a Christian hymn with German text written by Heinrich Bone in 1851 to a melody by Caspar Ulenberg dating to 1582.

History 
Heinrich Bone paraphrased Psalm 25 ("Unto thee, O LORD, do I lift up my soul. ") in 1851. In the Catholic hymnal Gotteslob, it is GL 142, in the section "Gesänge zur Eröffnung" (songs for the opening). The song is part of several hymnals.

References

External links 
 

19th-century hymns in German
1851 songs